The Atari Portfolio (Atari PC Folio) is an IBM PC-compatible palmtop PC, released by Atari Corporation in June 1989. This makes it the world's first palmtop computer.

History
DIP Research Ltd. based in Guildford, Surrey, UK released a product in the UK called the DIP Pocket PC in 1989. Soon after its release, DIP licensed this product to Atari for sale as the Portfolio in the UK and US. In Italy, Spain and Germany, it was originally marketed as PC Folio instead. DIP officially stood for "Distributed Information Processing", although secretly it actually stood for "David, Ian and Peter", the three founding members of the company who were former employees of Psion. The original founder of the company (first called "Crushproof Software") was Ian H. S. Cullimore, and the other two David Frodsham and Peter Baldwin. Cullimore was involved in designing the early Organiser products at Psion before the DIP Pocket PC project. The technologic successor of the Portfolio was the also DIP-developed Sharp PC-3000/3100. DIP Research was later acquired by Phoenix Technologies in 1994.

Technology

The Portfolio uses an Intel 80C88 CPU running at 4.9152 MHz and runs "DIP Operating System 2.11" (DIP DOS), an operating system mostly compatible to MS-DOS 2.11, but with some DOS 2.xx functionality lacking and some internal data structures more compatible with DOS 3.xx. It has 128 KB of RAM and 256 KB of ROM which contains the OS and built-in applications. The on-board RAM is divided between system memory and local storage (the C: drive). The LCD is monochrome without backlight and has  pixels or 40 characters × 8 lines.

The sound is handled by a small Dual-Tone Multi-Frequency speaker capable of outputting tones between 622 and 2,489Hz, the same range as touch tone telephones, so users could not only use the address book app to  store phone numbers, but actually speed dial them too by holding the device up to a telephone handset.

Power is supplied by three AA size removable alkaline batteries. The computer's memory is preserved during battery changes. There is also an optional AC adapter (120V: HPC-401, 230V: HPC-402).

There is an expansion port on the right side of the computer for parallel (HPC-101), serial (HPC-102), modem or MIDI expansion modules. It uses a Bee Card expansion port for removable memory (aka Credit Card Memory or CCM), which is not compatible with PC card as it predated that standard. Expansion cards were available in sizes of 32 KB (HPC-201), 64 KB (HPC-202), and 128 KB (HPC-203) initially, and later were available in capacities up to 4 MB. The expansion cards were backed up by a replaceable battery, which last approximately two years. Built-in applications include a text editor, spreadsheet (Lotus 1-2-3 compatible), phone book and time manager. Expansion cards contain programs such as a chess game (HPC-750), a file manager (HPC-704), and a finance manager (HPC-702). Most text-based DOS applications can run on the Portfolio as long as they did not directly access the hardware and could fit into the small memory.

Other expansion modules include a floppy drive, and a memory expansion unit (HPC-104). The memory expansion unit gives the Portfolio an additional 256 KB of RAM, which can be partitioned into several drives. It also features a pass-through expansion connector, allowing the use of more than one expansion unit. In theory, multiple memory expanders can be attached, increasing the available storage to over 640 KB.

A card reader (HPC-301) connects to a desktop PC to read and write to the expansion cards. The kit contains an ISA card, a special cable, the card reader, and software distributed on floppy disk.

A modem expansion module converts the portfolio into a miniature computer terminal. The modem is powered from the portfolio and came with an acoustic coupler consisting of two round shells that could be mounted over both ends of a handset with the aid of velcro strips. A direct connection to a telephone with a standard telephone lead is also possible. The complete terminal and coupler are portable, weighing only a few hundred grams.

Also, using the parallel port expansion module (HPC-101), a standard parallel cable and the software supplied (DOS based), the Portfolio can be connected to a PC for transferring files to and from the unit.

Credits for the development of the product can be found in an easter egg if one selects Setup, then Help, and then presses + ("Alt" plus "left square bracket").

Versions
 Atari Portfolio HPC-003: ROM version 1.052
 Atari Portfolio HPC-004: ROM version 1.056
 Atari Portfolio HPC-005: ROM version 1.130
 Atari Portfolio HPC-006: ROM version 1.072
 Atari Portfolio HPC-007: ROM version 1.130
 Atari PC Folio HPC-008: ROM version 1.130
 Atari Portfolio HPC-009: ROM version 1.130?
 Atari Portfolio HPC-010: ROM version 1.130?
 Atari Portfolio HPC-011: ROM version 1.130?, 512 KB

Accessories
 Atari HPC-101 Smart parallel interface
 Atari HPC-102 Serial interface
 Atari HPC-103 Memory expansion
 Atari HPC-104 Memory expander+
 Atari HPC-201 Memory card 32 KB
 Atari HPC-202 Memory card 64 KB
 Atari HPC-203 Memory card 128 KB
 Atari HPC-204 OTPROM card 512 KBit
 Atari HPC-205 OTPROM card 1 MBit
 Atari HPC-301 PC Card drive for PC ISA bus
 Atari HPC-401 Mains adapter 110 V
 Atari HPC-402 Mains adapter 220 V
 Atari HPC-406 Parallel cable
 Atari HPC-407 Serial cable
 Atari HPC-408 Parallel printer cable
 Atari HPC-409 Null modem cable
 Atari HPC-501 OTPROM adapter 512 KBit
 Atari HPC-502 OTPROM adapter 1 MBit
 Atari HPC-701 ROM card "Utility"
 Atari HPC-702 ROM card "Finance"
 Atari HPC-703 ROM card "Science"
 Atari HPC-704 ROM card "File Manager"
 Atari HPC-705 ROM card "Power BASIC"
 Atari HPC-709 ROM card "Instant Spell"
 Atari HPC-711 ROM card "U.S. Traveller's Guide)"
 Atari HPC-713 ROM card "Hyperlist"
 Atari HPC-715 ROM card "Language Translator"
 Atari HPC-724 ROM card "Bridge Baron"
 Atari HPC-725 ROM card "Wine Companion"
 Atari HPC-726 ROM card "Diet / Cholesterol Counter"
 Atari HPC-728 ROM card "Astrologer"
 Atari HPC-729 ROM card "Stock Tracker"
 Atari HPC-750 ROM card "Chess"
 Atari HPC-803 Portfolio system case

In popular culture
The Atari Portfolio was used by the character John Connor to crack PINs in two scenes in the 1991 film Terminator 2: Judgment Day.

Gallery

See also
Poqet PC
Poqet PC Prime
Poqet PC Plus
HP 95LX
HP 100LX
HP 200LX
HP 1000CX
HP OmniGo 700LX
Toshiba Libretto
Sharp PC-3000

ZEOS Pocket PC

References

External links

Unofficial Atari Portfolio site
Portfolio FAQ
Scanned Atari Portfolio Technical Reference Guide

The Atari Portfolio, Resources, The Concealed College
User's web page Photos, programmation, peripherals

Atari hardware
Personal digital assistants
Handheld personal computers
Products introduced in 1989
IBM PC compatibles